Myrmeciinae is a subfamily of the Formicidae, ants once found worldwide but now restricted to Australia and New Caledonia. This subfamily is one of several ant subfamilies which possess gamergates, female worker ants which are able to mate and reproduce, thus sustaining the colony after the loss of the queen. The Myrmeciinae subfamily was formerly composed of only one genus, Myrmecia, but the subfamily was redescribed by Ward & Brady in 2003 to include two tribes and four genera:  An additional three genera, one form genus, and 9 species were described in 2006 from the Early Eocene of Denmark, Canada, and Washington.  Subsequently an additional fossil genus was moved from the family Rhopalosomatidae in 2018, and a new genus was described in 2021.

Tribes and genera
Tribe Myrmeciini 
Myrmecia 
Tribe Prionomyrmecini 
Nothomyrmecia 
†Prionomyrmex 
Tribe incertae sedis
†Archimyrmex 
†Avitomyrmex 
†Macabeemyrma 
†Propalosoma 
†Tyrannomecia 
†Ypresiomyrma 
Form genus (for species belonging to the subfamily but not identifiable to current genera)
†Myrmeciites 

The Late Aptian Crato Formation genus Cariridris is sometimes included in Myrmeciinae, though it has also been classified as an Ampulicidae genus.  Two undescribed specimens in the Staatliches Museum für Naturkunde Stuttgart are known, suggesting a myrmeciine affinity.

Classification
The subfamily Myrmeciinae was established by Italian entomologist Carlo Emery in 1877 under the original name Myrmeciidae. It was named after the genus Myrmecia, the type genus of the subfamily. In 1882, the subfamily was treated as a tribe by French entomologist Ernest André within the former ant family Myrmicidae, but it would later be moved to the family Poneridae in 1905.

See also
List of Myrmecia species

References

External links

 
Ant subfamilies
Taxa named by Carlo Emery